The  Restroom Association, a non-profit, non-government organisation, was founded in 1998 by Jack Sim. The current president of the organisation is Mr Ho Chee Kit. Till date, RAS have great support from the 3Ps which are the public, private and people sector.

In RAS, they have four main pillars namely the Community, Outreach and Education, Research Development and Training and Standards.

RAS strongly believe in advocating clean toilets for everyone.

LOO Campaign 
The LOO Campaign launch in Singapore Zoological Garden (Pavilion by the Lake) was launched on 19 November 2008 to target the owners, cleaners and users.

On 3 December 2010, a three-day LOO Carnival was organised by RAS and held at the National Library building.

References

Notes 
 "Call the Toilet Police," Electric New Paper
 "Catholic High Primary turns toilets into works of art" Channelnewsasia.com

External links
 Restroom Association
 Restroom Association YouTube
 Restroom Association Facebook

Non-profit organisations based in Singapore
Toilets